Sean Merrick, known professionally over his career by the pseudonyms Jacky Jasper, H-Bomb and HDV is a Canadian-American rapper, record producer and celebrity gossip blogger.

Merrick is best known for his work with Kool Keith under the name H-Bomb as a part of rap groups KHM (later known as Clayborne Family) and 7th Veil, as well as for performing as Jacky Jasper on Kool Keith's album First Come, First Served and the Analog Brothers album Pimp To Eat.

In Canada he is also known as a major contributor to the country's early hip hop scene while performing as HDV, as well as for his 1990 single "Pimp of the Microphone".

Under the moniker Jacky Jasper, Merrick also became co-founder of and major contributor to the tabloid news site Diary of a Hollywood Street King. The blog was credited as having been the first to publish Charlie Sheen's HIV status in 2014.

Career
Merrick, performing out of Toronto under the stage name HDV, released his first album Sex, Drugs + Violence through Canadian independent record label ISBA Records. The album spawned his best known Canadian single "Pimp of the Microphone". That same year he also performed as a member of the Canadian hip-hop and dance music supergroup Dance Appeal. The group was formed to protest CRTC decision 90-693 by which an FM station license was awarded to a country music station rather than a station featuring black and dance music oriented programming, which the city of Toronto had been lacking. The group released the single "CRTC (Can't Repress The Cause)" that went on to win the MuchMusic Video Award for Best Dance Music Video of the Year in 1991.

In 1993 Merrick released his second solo album as HDV, Higher Deeper Values again on ISBA Records. HDV was known for pornographic lyrics and for dealing with subjects such as the life of black people in Canada's inner cities as well as racial-tension and politics. Merrick also spent eight months in a Toronto jail after being convicted of living off the avails of prostitution.

Merrick moved to New York City, then on to California where he released the albums In Yo' Face  in 1996 and Narcissism 1997 under the alias H-Bomb.  Narcissism also gave rise to the single "Playa's Need No Love" with Roger Troutman, which peaked at number 33 on the Hot Rap Songs, making it Merrick's first charted single.

Merrick met Kool Keith and Ice-T and appeared on Keith's 1999 album First Come, First Served as well as the Analog Brothers' 2000 album Pimp to Eat under the moniker Jacky Jasper. Merrick, Kool Keith and rapper Marc Live formed the hip hop trio KHM and released their debut album in 2002 titled Game. From 2002 to 2004, Merrick released two more solo albums under the Jacky Jasper alias, Keep My Shit Clean and Jacky Who?. 2004 also saw the release of the sophomore KHM album titled Clayborne Family.

In 2005, Merrick served as a producer on Shade Sheist's sophomore album Before The Waitin' Before The Hatin under the name H-Bomb. Merrick and Keith collaborated once again to form a rap duo 7th Veil. They released an album titled Stoned in 2008, featuring production from Chilly Chill and guest appearances from Snoop Dogg, Kurupt, Ike Turner, Rick James, Silkk the Shocker and Flavor Flav among others.

In 2009 Merrick co-founded the tabloid news site Diary of a Hollywood Street King under his pseudonym Jacky Jasper. Merrick would also become the main contributor to the site. The site was the first to publish Charlie Sheen's HIV status in April 2014.

 Discography SinglesGuest appearances'

References 

Living people
Year of birth missing (living people)
20th-century Canadian rappers
21st-century Canadian rappers
Canadian hip hop record producers
Canadian bloggers
Black Canadian musicians
Black Canadian writers
Rappers from Toronto